Diplotaxis siettiana, known in Spanish as , is a species of flowering plant in the family Brassicaceae. It is endemic to Alborán Island in the western Mediterranean Sea, where it grows only around the helipad. The natural population became extinct in 1974, but was re-introduced in 1999. Its natural habitat is Mediterranean-type shrubby vegetation. It is threatened by habitat loss.

References

siettiana
Endemic flora of Spain
Matorral shrubland
Critically endangered plants
Critically endangered biota of Europe
Plants described in 1933
Taxonomy articles created by Polbot